Nikolay Terentyev (born 21 March 1996) is a Russian ice sledge hockey player from Murmansk. He is a double-amputee who initially began playing for White Bears in Moscow and two months later appeared at Russian Championships. Since then he participated at the 2013 IPC Ice Sledge Hockey World Championships at which he was the youngest to compete at. Even though he spent only 4 minutes at the game he and his team managed to win bronze medal. In September 2013 he took part at the International "4 Nations" Tournament which was followed by World Sledge Hockey Challenge which was hosted in Toronto, Canada in December of the same year. While there, he played 5 games in which he scored 5 goals and tied himself with Greg Westlake. During the 2014 Winter Paralympic Games in Sochi, Russia his team won a silver medal. Prior to it he scored a goal against Norway during which tournament his team won 4–0.

References

1996 births
Living people
Russian sledge hockey players
Paralympic sledge hockey players of Russia
Paralympic silver medalists for Russia
Sportspeople with limb difference
People from Apatity
People from Murmansk
Medalists at the 2014 Winter Paralympics
Paralympic medalists in sledge hockey
Ice sledge hockey players at the 2014 Winter Paralympics
Sportspeople from Murmansk Oblast